AM Driver, known in Japan as , is an anime series produced by Studio Deen, TV Tokyo and Nihon Ad Systems. It is directed by Yūji Yamaguchi, with Satoshi Namiki handling series composition, Eiji Suganuma designing the characters and Kazunori Maruyama composing the music. The series aired on TV Tokyo and its affiliate stations from April 5, 2004 to March 28, 2005. A manga adaptation by Noriyuki Konishi was serialized in CoroCoro Comic from the June 2004 issue to the February 2005 issue. Two Game Boy Advance games and one PlayStation 2 game published by Konami have also been released.

The series was the first completely original work produced by Nihon Ad Systems, who have previously only produced works based on manga and video games. As a result of various planning discussions, it was decided to develop a life-size hero with the concept of a person "putting on" a mecha by having a person in a power suit board the mecha and transforming and combining with the mecha, rather than a robot.

Plot
The story takes place in the future world of Earth, which has been under attack by mechanical life forms known as "bugchines" for several years. The masses were living in fear, as no weaponry could stand up to the bugchines. To turn back this menace, warriors called AM Drivers are trained and armed with special weapons. The AM Drivers constantly fight to protect the general public. The most popular AM Drivers get larger budgets with which they may purchase more powerful weapons and defenses.

Characters

List of episodes

References

External links
  
 

2004 anime television series debuts
2004 manga
Mecha anime and manga
Studio Deen
TV Tokyo original programming
Anime with original screenplays